Eyeball is a term for the entire eye.

Eyeball may also refer to:

 Eyeball (film), 1975 Italian-Spanish film
 Eyeball Records, an American independent record label (1975-2012)
 Eyeball Networks, a Canadian company whose products include Eyeball Chat
 Eyeballs is internet jargon for number of viewers of webpages or sites, see attention economy

See also
 Eye (disambiguation)
 Eyes (disambiguation)